Andrea F. Young is an American experimental physicist and assistant professor at the University of California, Santa Barbara. In 2018, he was awarded the New Horizons in Physics Prize for his work on van der Waals heterostructures and quantum Hall phases.

Education and career 
Young received his bachelor's degree in 2006 and his doctoral degree in 2012 from Columbia University, where he studied the properties of graphene. From 2011 to 2014, he was a Pappalardo Fellow in experimental condensed matter physics at Massachusetts Institute of Technology (MIT). Following his postdoctoral fellowship at MIT, he was a visiting scientist at the Weizmann Institute of Science. Young joined the faculty at University of California, Santa Barbara (UCSB) in 2015.

Awards and honors 
In 2016, Young was awarded the William McMillan Prize from the University of Illinois Department of Physics and the Packard Fellowship for Science and Engineering. He was additionally a recipient of an AFOSR Young Investigator grant (2016) Young was awarded a Sloan Research Fellowship in 2017. He received the 2018 New Horizons in Physics Prize.

References 

Living people
American physicists
Experimental physicists
Columbia College (New York) alumni
University of California, Santa Barbara faculty
People from Washington, D.C.
Year of birth missing (living people)
Columbia Graduate School of Arts and Sciences alumni